Luísa Dias Diogo (born 11 April 1958) is a Mozambican politician who served as Prime Minister of Mozambique from February 2004 to January 2010. She replaced Pascoal Mocumbi, who had been Prime Minister for the previous nine years. Before becoming Prime Minister, she was Minister of Planning and Finance, and she continued to hold that post until February 2005. 

She was the first female Prime Minister of Mozambique. Diogo represents the party FRELIMO, which has ruled the country since independence in 1975.

Early life and education
Diogo studied economics at Eduardo Mondlane University in Maputo. She graduated with a bachelor's degree in 1983. She went on to obtain a master's degree in financial economics at the School of Oriental and African Studies, University of London in 1992.

Career
Diogo began working in the Mozambique Finance Ministry in 1980 while she was still a college student. She became head of department in 1986 and national budget director in 1989. She then went to work for the World Bank, as the programme officer in Mozambique. In 1994 she joined the FRELIMO government as Deputy Minister of Finance under Mozambican President Joaquim Chissano.

In 2003, United Nations Secretary-General Kofi Annan appointed Diogo to the United Nations Commission on the Private Sector and Development, which was co-chaired by Prime Minister Paul Martin of Canada and President Ernesto Zedillo of Mexico.

Prime Minister, 2004–2010
Diogo was appointed prime minister in February 2004, succeeding Pascoal Mocumbi. She continued to hold her post as finance minister until 2005.

In September 2005, Diogo was the international guest speaker at the British Labour Party Conference.

In 2006, Annan appointed Diogo to co-chair – alongside Shaukat Aziz and Jens Stoltenberg – a High-level Panel on United Nations Systemwide Coherence, which was set up to explore how the United Nations system could work more coherently and effectively across the world in the areas of development, humanitarian assistance and the environment. She was also a member of the Commission on Effective Development Cooperation with Africa which was set up by the Prime Minister Anders Fogh Rasmussen of Denmark and held meetings between April and October 2008.

After reports that some farmers were refusing to leave their livestock in areas threatened by the 2007 Mozambican flood, Diogo ordered forcible evacuations of citizens in low-lying areas of the Zambezi valley.

During her time in office, Diogo urged the African health ministers to offer reproductive and sexual health services free of charge throughout the continent. These services could reduce infant mortality by two thirds, reduce maternal mortality by three quarters, reverse the spread of AIDS, and promote gender equality and the empowerment of women. The target set by the UN was to achieve these goals by 2015.

Diogo also focused on gender equality and women's empowerment through a recently launched "Network of Women Ministers and Parliamentarians" (MUNIPA). The MUNIPA network aims to strengthen advocacy and lobbying activities so that policies and legislation are adopted favourable to gender equity and women's empowerment. Promoting equality between men and women is a central concern of the Mozambican government, which has been adopting instruments to promote women's empowerment at all levels [of government].

Life after politics
In August 2010, UN Secretary-General Ban Ki-moon appointed Diogo to the High-Level Panel on Global Sustainability, which was co-chaired by presidents Tarja Halonen of Finland and Jacob Zuma of South Africa.

In 2014, Diogo came second to Filipe Nyusi in FRELIMO’s elections for candidate in that year’s general elections. At the time, she was backed by a party faction led by Chissano.

In 2016, Diogo was appointed by Erik Solheim, the Chairman of the Development Assistance Committee, to serve on the High Level Panel on the Future of the Development Assistance Committee under the leadership of Mary Robinson.

Corporate boards
 Absa Bank Mozambique, Chairwoman of the Board (since 2012)

Non-profit organizations
 African Union Foundation, Member of the Council
 Brenthurst Foundation, Member of the Advisory Board
 Club de Madrid, Member
 Council of Women World Leaders, Member 
 NOVAFRICA of the Universidade Nova de Lisboa, Member of the Advisory Board

Trivia
In a 2010 op-ed in The New York Times, Irish musician and activist Bono described Diogo as having "the lioness energy of an Ellen Johnson Sirleaf, a Ngozi Okonjo-Iweala or a Graça Machel."

See also 
 Heads of Government of Mozambique

References

External links
Blazing a trail for Africa's women BBC
"Luisa Diogo Biography", ''Encyclopedia of World Biography.

1958 births
Living people
21st-century Mozambican women politicians
21st-century Mozambican politicians
Alumni of SOAS University of London
Alumni of University of London Worldwide
Alumni of the University of London
Women rulers in Africa
FRELIMO politicians
Mozambican economists
Prime Ministers of Mozambique
Finance ministers of Mozambique
Women prime ministers
World Bank people
Women government ministers of Mozambique
People from Tete Province
Mozambican officials of the United Nations
Female finance ministers